is a Japanese women's professional shogi player ranked 1-dan.

Early life
Aikawa was born in Suginami, Tokyo on April 18, 1994. She learned how to play shogi from her father when she was about seven years old.

In August 2007, she finished runner up in the girl's division of the 28th  as a junior high school student, and was honored by the Suginami City Board of Education as a result.

In the Fall of 2008, Ailkawa entered the Women's Apprentice Professional League under the guidance of shogi professional , but was moved to Training Group Class D2 in April 2009 after the JSA ended the Women's Apprentice Professional League system at the end of March 2009. Aikawa was promoted to training group Class C1 in May June 2011, which earned her the right to request to be promoted to the women's provisional shogi player status and the rank of 3-kyū. Aikawa submitted her request to the JSA, which announced in August that and she was to be officially awarded the rank and provisional women's professional status on October 1, 2011.

Promotion history
Aikawa's promotion history is as follows:
 3-kyū: October 1, 2011
 2-kyū: August 17, 2013
 1-kyū: February 24, 2015
 1-dan: April 1, 2015

Note: All ranks are women's professional ranks.

References

External links
 ShogiHub: Aikawa, Haruka

Japanese shogi players
Living people
Women's professional shogi players
Professional shogi players from Tokyo
People from Suginami
1994 births